Raphaela Neihausen (born August 14, 1976) is an American filmmaker and producer.

Biography
Neihausen was born in 1976. Neihausen is Jewish. Together with husband Thom Powers, she founded DOC NYC, America's largest documentary festival. Her documentaries Miss Gulag (2007), Joe's Violin (2016) earned her critical acclaim including an Academy Award nomination for Best Documentary Short Subject at 89th Academy Awards, with director Kahane Cooperman.

She has been a resident of Montclair, New Jersey.

Filmography
 Miss Gulag (2007)
 Joe's Violin (2016)

Awards and nominations
 Nominated: Academy Award for Best Documentary (Short Subject) - Joe's Violin

References

External links
 

Living people
American producers
American directors
20th-century American Jews
People from Montclair, New Jersey
1976 births
21st-century American Jews